FK 14 Oktomvri 1946 is a football club based in the village of Krupište near Štip, North Macedonia. They currently play in the Macedonian Third League.

References

External links 
14 Oktomvri 1946 Facebook 
Club info at MacedonianFootball 
Football Federation of Macedonia 

Football clubs in North Macedonia
Karbinci Municipality